Malavika Wales is an Indian actress and classical dancer. She is from a Malayali family from Thrissur. She made her acting debut in Malarvaadi Arts Club.

Personal life

Malavika was born to late P. G. Wales and Sudina Wales at Thrissur. She has an elder brother, Mithun Wales. She did her schooling at Hari Sri Vidya Nidhi School, Thrissur and later went to Anupam Kher's actor preparation, in Mumbai to do a diploma in acting. She did her BA in English literature at the IGNOU.

Malavika started learning dance when she was 6 years old and had her Arangettam at Guruvayur Sreekrishna Temple three years later. She has learned under maestros such as Kalamandalam Kshemavathy and Kalamandalam Prasanna Unni. She is trained in Bharatanatyam, Mohiniyattom and Kuchipudi.

Career

She participated at the Miss Kerala contest in 2009. At age 17, she was the youngest contestant that year. She made it till the third round and was adjudged ‘Miss Beautiful Eyes’ at the contest. Later, Vineeth Sreenivasan saw her photos and auditioned her for a role in Malarvaadi Arts Club.

Although Malarvaadi Arts Club was her first release, she had acted in Lenin Rajendran’s Makaramanju before. When she was studying in Class VI, she also acted in his documentary, Aisha. She starred in Nandeesha the Kannada remake of the Malayalam blockbuster, Thilakkam, where she reprised Kavya Madhavan's role. She was then seen in My Fan Ramu and later in the art house flick, Aattakatha, where she played the Anglo-Indian daughter of a Kathakali artiste played by actor Vineeth.

Malavika made her Tamil debut in  Enna Satham Indha Neram in which she was seen as a teacher of deaf-mute students. She has signed her first Telugu filmDhaari, a triangular love story which will be directed by Sreenivas, starring Vishnu and Parameshwar which failed to see theatrical release. She is also working on two Tamil films: director Azhaguselva's Azhagumagan, which was her debut Tamil film which got indefinitely delayed for 6 years and released in 2018, and Arasuvai Arasan which was a flop at the box office

Television debut and success
In 2015, Malavika made her television debut through the Malayalam TV series Ponnambili which aired on Mazhavil Manorama which made her a common name among Malayali households.

She acted in Nandini, a South Indian multilingual serial as Janaki (spirit) pair of Rahul Ravi for the second time airing in Sun TV, Surya TV, Gemini TV and Udaya TV.
She also acted in Ammuvinte Amma as Anupama along with Vinaya Prasad. She is one of the popular lead actress in South Indian television industry. Now she is currently working in Manjil Virinja Poovu in Mazhavil Manorama.

Filmography

Television

Awards

2016ManappuramMinnale TV Awards Best Television Actor (Female) 2016 (for Ponnambili)
2018 : Kochi Times : Most desirable women on television #1
2020 : Kochi Times : Most desirable women on television #1
2021 : Kochi Times : Most desirable women on television #1
2021 : Raj Narayanji Foundation Best Actress television (for Manjilvirinja poovu)
2022: gurupriya TV awards : best actress (for Manjilvirinja poovu)

References

External links

 Official website
 

Living people
Indian film actresses
Actresses from Thrissur
Actresses in Malayalam cinema
Indian female classical dancers
Performers of Indian classical dance
Bharatanatyam exponents
Mohiniyattam exponents
Indian television actresses
Actresses in Malayalam television
21st-century Indian actresses
Actresses in Telugu cinema
Actresses in Tamil cinema
21st-century Indian dancers
Dancers from Kerala
Artists from Thrissur
Hari Sri Vidya Nidhi School alumni
Women artists from Kerala
21st-century Indian women artists
Actresses in Kannada television
Actresses in Kannada cinema
Year of birth missing (living people)